Wangjiawan station, is a station on Line 4 of the Nanjing Metro that opened in January 2017 along with eighteen other stations as part of Line 4's first phase. The station is located underneath the T-intersection of Jiangwangmiao Avenue and Dongfang Road on an east–west axis and is within walking distance of Purple Mountain. Originally named Jiangwangmiao Station during Line 4's planning phase, that name was later transferred to the immediately preceding station to the west.

References

Railway stations in Jiangsu
Railway stations in China opened in 2017
Nanjing Metro stations